Tiny Truckers is a children's rail ride operated at Chessington World of Adventures Resort in London. Originally opened in 1993 under the name ToyTown Truckers. As of August 2014, the ride continues to operate.

History
Tiny Truckers was manufactured by Zamperla for Chessington World of Adventures Resort in London in 1993. It opened in the area of ToyTown, and later moved to the Market Square area.

Description
Set on a powered track in the base of Toy Town, the ride makes its way around the winding track, with green scenery and Dragon's Fury overhead. There is no age limit, though children under 1.1 metre in height must be accompanied by an adult.

See also

Chessington World of Adventures Resort

References

External links

Chessington World of Adventures rides
1993 establishments in England
Tourist attractions in London
Amusement rides introduced in 1993
Amusement rides manufactured by Zamperla